, formerly , was the daughter of Prince Tsunehisa Takeda and Princess Masako Takeda, and was thus the granddaughter of Emperor Meiji through her mother's side. She married Tsunemitsu Sano in March 1934, and had four children. She lost her status as a member of the Imperial Family in October 1947 with the abolition of collateral imperial houses by the American Occupation Authorities. She died on September 3, 2003. Her grave is in Aoyama Cemetery, and the stone is marked with her Christian name, Maria (マリヤ).

References

1913 births
2003 deaths
Japanese princesses
People of Shōwa-period Japan